Raymond S. Nickerson is an American psychologist and author. He was a senior vice president at BBN Technologies, from which he is retired, He is now research professor at Tufts University in the Psychology Department. He has authored several books and is the founding editor of The Journal of Experimental Psychology: Applied.

Topics he has written about include: confirmation bias, [(null hypothesis significance testing)], the exchange paradox) the boy or girl paradox and [(long-term memory)]

Work 
Books:
The Teaching of Thinking (with David N. Perkins & Edward E. Smith) (1985) Erlbaum.
Using Computers: Human Factors in Information Systems (1986) MIT Press.
Reflections on Reasoning (1986) Erlbaum.
Looking Ahead: Human Factors Challenges in a Changing World (1992) Erlbaum.
Psychology and Environmental Change (2003) Erlbaum.
Cognition and Chance: The Psychology of Probabilistic Reasoning (2004) Erlbaum.
Aspects of Rationality: Reflections on What it Means to be Rational and Whether we are (2008) Psychology Press.
Mathematical Reasoning: Patterns, Problems, Conjectures and Proofs (2010) Psychology Press.
Conditional Reasoning: The Unruly Syntactics, Semantics, Thematics, and Pragmatics of "If" (2015) Oxford University Press.

Membership 

 Fellow:
 American Association for the Advancement of Science
American Psychological Association
Association for Psychological Science
Human Factors and Ergonomics Society
Society of Experimental Psychologists

Selected works 
 1996. "Hempel's Paradox and Wason's Selection Task: Logical and Psychological Puzzles of Confirmation," Thinking and Reasoning 2, 1-31
 1998. "Confirmation Bias: A Ubiquitous Phenomenon in Many Guises," Review of General Psychology vol. 2, no. 2, 175-220
 2009, with F. S. Butler & M. Carlin. "Empathy and Knowledge Projection," in Decety & Ickes (Eds.), Social Neuroscience of Empathy (pp. 43–56). Cambridge, MA: MIT Press.

References 

Living people
Fellows of the American Association for the Advancement of Science
Tufts University faculty
21st-century American psychologists
Year of birth missing (living people)